Czech Lion Award for Best Stage Design is award given to the Czech film with best Stage Design.

Winners

External links

Czech Lion Awards
Awards established in 2013